Robert Trogolo (born 15 June 1953) is a former professional tennis player from South Africa.

Career
Trogolo was recruited to play tennis for the University of Mary Hardin–Baylor in 1972.

The South African reached the third round of the 1979 US Open, beating Rick Fisher and Jan Norbäck, before being eliminated by José Luis Clerc in four sets. That year he won three Challenger doubles titles within the space of a month, with Sashi Menon as his partner.

The pair competed together in both 1980 Wimbledon Championships and the 1980 US Open but were unable to progress past the first round in either. In both of those tournaments he also took part in the singles. He was defeated in the opening round of Wimbledon by Phil Dent but made the second round at the US Open, with a win over Fernando Maynetto. That year he was also a singles quarter-finalist in the San Juan Open and doubles finalist in New Orleans, partnering Raymond Moore.

Grand Prix career finals

Doubles: 1 (0–1)

Challenger titles

Doubles: (3)

References

External links
 
 

1953 births
Living people
South African male tennis players
Tennis players from Johannesburg
White South African people